Charles Horn is a Canadian comedy writer, producer and vegan activist.

Biography

Charles Horn was born and raised in Toronto, Ontario, Canada and received his PhD in Electrical Engineering from Princeton University.  Horn has written for Fugget About It, Robot Chicken, Robot Chicken: Star Wars, HBO, and freelanced for The Tonight Show with Jay Leno.  He is also the author of The Laugh Out Loud Guide: Ace the SAT Exam without Boring Yourself to Sleep!, a comedic and educational SAT study guide published by Andrews McMeel. Horn was nominated in 2008 for an Emmy award for his writing on Robot Chicken: Star Wars.

Veganism

Horn has authored Meat Logic: Why Do We Eat Animals, a book examining justifications for eating meat and other animal products. The book argues for veganism.

Bibliography
The Laugh Out Loud Guide: Ace the SAT Exam without Boring Yourself to Sleep!, Andrews McMeel Publishing, 2008.
That's Just Wrong! (a collection of sketch comedy), 2011.
That's Just Wrong 2! (a collection of sketch comedy), 2012.
That's Just Wrong 3! (a collection of sketch comedy), 2013.
Meat Logic: Why Do We Eat Animals?, 2014.

References

External links

Year of birth missing (living people)
Living people
Canadian comedy writers
Canadian television writers
Canadian veganism activists
Princeton University alumni
Writers from Toronto